Diego de los Ríos y Nicolau (9 April 1850 – 4 November 1911) was a Spanish Lieutenant General who was known as the last Spanish Governor-General of the Philippines during the Spanish-American War. He also served in the Glorious Revolution, the Third Carlist War and the Ten Years' War.

Military Career
Diego was born on 9 April 1850 as the son of Lieutenant General Diego de los Rios the Elder and was given the title "Underage ensign of the Cavalry" in 1860 due to his fathers service in the Hispano-Moroccan War. In the same year, he specialized in infantry combat and was promoted to Lieutenant in 1865. In 1868, he participated in the Glorious Revolution and was promoted to Captain for his service in the revolution. For the next three years, he served in Puerto Rico. When he returned to the Spanish mainland, he participated in the Third Carlist War but was seriously wounded during the Battle of Castellfullit on July 1874 when he was promoted to Commander. After the treatment of his wound, he continued to fight the Carlist forces in the north, taking part in the battles of Sierra de Puyarruego, Ermita de la Trinidad de Lumbier and Sierra de Leire.

He was promoted to Lieutenant Colonel on 1876 but had to then serve in the ongoing Ten Years' War. Once he arrived in Cuba, he was in charge of several operations as he commanded several battalions until the Pact of Zanjón was signed and he returned to Spain to marry Matilde Sáenz Santa María. There he would serve various posts, including becoming King Alfonso XII's aide-de-camp in 1886, commanding the Ciudad Rodrigo Battalion in Madrid and dealing with the uprising of the Garellano and Albuera regiments on September 19 as he left with his unit under the orders of Captain General Manuel Pavía in pursuit of the rebels along the Paseo de Atocha, Vallecas, Morata de Tajuña and Arganda. For his service, he was proposed to the Ministry of State for the Commander of the Order of Isabella the Catholic. After his promotion to Brigadier General on 1895, he was sent to the Philippines under the command of Ramón Blanco who appointed him the commander of the First Brigade of the Mindanao Division.

Governor-General of the Philippines

Government in Iloilo
In September 1898, he became the Governor-General of the Philippines during the Spanish–American War after the United States of America took control of Manila after the 1898 Battle of Manila.  The capital of the Spanish Philippines was at that time in Iloilo.  While fighting with the Americans was over, the Spanish authorities continued to fight the forces of the Philippine Revolution for control of the country outside of Manila and Manila Bay.

Desiring to save the Visayas and Mindanao from being conquered by Philippine revolutionary forces, de los Rios asked Spain to grant some reforms demanded by citizens of Iloilo. He issued in Iloilo a proclamation to the people of the Visayas calling on them to establish a "Council of Reforms" to be made up of 24 leading citizens, 12 of whom would be selected by popular vote and another 12 to be appointed by the governor-general himself. The granted reforms, however, satisfied only a few ilustrado leaders and the Philippine revolution in Iloilo heated up.

The general uprising against the Spanish authorities on Panay, particularly in Iloilo, took place on  October 28, 1898. On that day onward, the interior towns of the province of Iloilo were liberated from Spanish control. By the first week of November, only Jaro, Molo, and Iloilo remained in the hands of the Spaniards. On November 21, Jaro was delivered by the Spanish government to the Ilonggo revolutionary forces.

His term as Governor-General of the Philippines legally ended on December 10, 1898, when the Treaty of Paris was signed transferring sovereignty of the Philippines from Spain to the United States. The Philippine Revolution however continued, and would become the Philippine–American War early in 1899.

With the Spanish army being besieged by the revolutionary troops in the positions which they held in Iloilo and Molo, and being threatened by a decisive attack, the Spanish government under De los Rios eventually opened up negotiations with the Ilonggos. The outcome of the negotiations was the evacuation of Molo and Iloilo City by the Spanish troops and their subsequent surrender to the native forces under the command of Gen. Martin Delgado at Plaza Alfonso XII (now Plaza Libertad) on 23 December 1898, which implied Iloilo City as the last capital of the Spanish Empire in Asia and the Pacific.

He left Iloilo and transferred temporarily to Real Fuerza de Nuestra Señora La Virgen del Pilar de Zaragoza in Zamboanga bringing with him the remnants of his colonial forces in the Visayas on the eve of the surrender of the Spanish forces in Visayas to the Ilonggo revolutionaries on December 24, 1898. Thereafter when moved to Zamboanga as his last bastion, he surrendered to the authorities.

In Zamboanga
The Governor-General upon his arrival at Fort Pilar on December 24, 1898, immediately made preparations for the defense against the Philippine revolutionaries. He brought the colonial forces from Cotabato and Lanao and consolidated them all at Fort Pilar. The Governor-General of Mindanao Island, General Jaramillo, transferred his command to General Montero, ex-governor of Cebu, and left for Manila with General Rios in Dec. 1898.

In Manila
General Diego de los Rios brought his troops to Manila in January 1899, before the troops' departure to Spain.  The general remained in Manila until 3 June 1899, trying to secure the release of Spanish prisoners from the rebels.  General Nicola Jaramillo then took over negotiations.

Later Military Career
Upon his return to the Spanish mainland, he was appointed military governor of Seville in 1902 and was promoted to Lieutenant General in 1907. He held high civil and military positions as counselor of the Supreme War and Navy Council, Captain-General of Andalusia, chief of the Army Staff, senator for the Province of Cáceres and Captain-General of the First Military Region in 1909 which he commanded until his death.

References

Spanish Governors of the Philippines
Gen. Alvarez-Greatest revolutionary hero 
The Iloilo culmination of the declaration of Philippine Independence
National Historical Commission of the Philippines - "A Filipino society with citizens informed of their history, who love their country and are proud of their cultural heritage."

External links
El general Ríos: notas biográficas. ABC. 13 November 191.  p. 13

1850 births
1911 deaths
People from Madrid
Captains General of the Philippines
Spanish military personnel of the Third Carlist War (Governmental faction)
People of the Ten Years' War
Spanish military personnel of the Spanish–American War